Princess Amalia of Teck (Amalie Josephine Henriette Agnes Sussane, 12 November 1838 – 20 July 1893), known as Countess Amalie of Hohenstein until her marriage in 1863, was an Austrian noblewoman closely related to the royal houses of Württemberg and the United Kingdom.

Biography 
She was the third and last of the children of the marriage formed by Duke Alexander of Württemberg and Countess Claudine von Hohenstein (born Countess Rhédey de Kis-Rhéde). As the latter did not belong to any reigning or mediatised house, the marriage was declared morganatic and her mother was granted the title of Countess of Hohenstein by Emperor Ferdinand I of Austria. This last title was the one that both Amalie and her siblings carried from their birth. Her siblings were:

 Countess Claudine of Hohenstein (1836-1894), later Princess of Teck, single;
 Count Francis of Hohenstein (1837-1900), later Prince of Teck and Duke of Teck, married to Princess Mary Adelaide of Cambridge;

She was orphaned in 1841, after her mother died as a result of a horseback riding accident. She spent her childhood and youth in Vienna with her father and siblings.

On 13 October 1863, she married Count Paul von Hügel, an Austrian officer.

After the wedding, they moved to Reinthal Castle, near Graz, owned by her husband's family. Her sister Claudine moved into a Swiss-style chalet near the castle. She had a quiet and provincial life with her family with occasional visits from her brother Francis and his wife Mary Adelaide, as well as his children, among whom was Mary of Teck, future queen consort of the United Kingdom. On 16 December 1871, her cousin Charles I of Württemberg raised her to princess of Teck, just as his father, William I of Württemberg, had done with her siblings on 1 December 1863.

She died in 1893 as a result of cancer. She was buried in the cemetery of St. Peter in Graz.

Titles and styles 

 28 August 1837 – 13 October 1863 : Countess Amalie of Hohenstein
 13 October 1863 - 16 December 1871: Countess Amalie of Hohenstein, Baroness von Hügel
 16 December 1871 – 13 June 1879: Her Serene Highness Princess Amalie of Teck, Baroness von Hügel
 13 June 1879 - 20 July 1893: Her Serene Highness Princess Amalie of Teck, Countess von Hügel<ref name=":1" /

References

Sources

External links 

 

Teck-Cambridge family
1838 births
1893 deaths
Austrian countesses
Counts of Hohenstein